The 1920 Delaware Fightin' Blue Hens football team was an American football team that represented Delaware College (later renamed the University of Delaware) in the 1920 college football season. In their second and final season under head coach Burton Shipley, the Blue Hens compiled a 3–5–1 record and were outscored by a total of 201 to 55. The team played its home games at Frazer Field in Newark, Delaware.

Schedule

References

Delaware
Delaware Fightin' Blue Hens football seasons
Delaware Fightin' Blue Hens football